Ilmar Ojase (born 6 July 1973) is an Estonian former backstroke swimmer. He competed in three events at the 1992 Summer Olympics.

References

External links
 

1973 births
Living people
Estonian male backstroke swimmers
Olympic swimmers of Estonia
Swimmers at the 1992 Summer Olympics
People from Mineralnye Vody